Asanka Shehan Semasinghe   is a Sri Lankan Politician and a member of the Parliament of Sri Lanka from Anuradhapura. He belongs to the Sri Lanka Podujana Peramuna. He is currently serving as Minister of State for Finance, serving with Ranjith Siyambalapitiya since 8 September 2022. Following the mass resignation of the Sri Lankan cabinet in the wake of the 2022 Sri Lankan protests, he was appointed as the Minister of Trade by President Gotabaya Rajapaksa on 18 April 2022. He left office on May 9 following the resignation of then Prime Minister Mahinda Rajapaksa and thereby the collapse of the government.

Notes

References

Members of the 14th Parliament of Sri Lanka
Members of the 15th Parliament of Sri Lanka
Members of the 16th Parliament of Sri Lanka
Sri Lanka Podujana Peramuna politicians
Sri Lanka Freedom Party politicians
United People's Freedom Alliance politicians
1976 births
Living people
Sinhalese politicians